Sonic Universe was an American comic book series published by Archie Comics in association with Sega, based on the latter's Sonic the Hedgehog. It is a spin-off of the comic book series of the same name, and shared continuity with that title. Sonic Universe centers on several characters featured throughout the franchise and comics, including Shadow the Hedgehog, Blaze the Cat, and Silver the Hedgehog.

The series follows a unique format, in which its lead character and story arc change every four issues, and usually occur concurrently with those in the flagship Sonic title, though within different locations. Sonic himself usually does not appear in these stories, except for occasional supporting appearances.

Fleetway, the producers of the UK-based Sonic The Comic series, produced a similar series of stories called "Sonic's World" from issue 26 onwards; it, too, expanded the fictional universe, following various characters in the Sonic universe on their own adventures, which eventually crossed over into the core series on numerous occasions.

Sonic Universe was published monthly by Archie Comics alongside its parent title Sonic the Hedgehog. The first issue was released in February 2009, following the cancellation of Sonic X; issue #94 was the last, released in January 2017. An official Sonic Universe blog was run on Archie Comics' website that would occasionally go into further detail about the events in the stories, such as revealing what happened in the alternate timeline Silver the Hedgehog traveled to in The Silver Saga after he left, but it has since been discontinued.

The series subsequently surpassed Knuckles the Echidna as the longest running spinoff of the main series.

In July 2017, Sega announced the discontinuation of their business relationship with Archie Comics, and thus the latter will no longer release any further Sonic the Hedgehog comics, including Sonic Universe.

Synopsis

Issues #1–50
Issues #1–4, entitled "The Shadow Saga", follow Shadow the Hedgehog continuing the events from Sonic the Hedgehog #196 and Sonic X #40. Shadow and Metal Sonic end up on the alternate world that is home to Blaze the Cat, who teams up with Shadow to help him defeat the robot and return to his own reality. Following this, Shadow and Rouge the Bat team up with Sonic the Hedgehog to neutralize a weapon that Dr. Eggman intends to use against Sonic's team of Freedom Fighters and possibly other forces opposed to him. This was followed by Shadow's first encounter with future teammate E-123 Omega, and the pair teaming up with Rouge to become Team Dark and retrieve a Chaos Emerald.

Issues #5–8, covered "Mobius: 30 Years Later", featuring a return to a possible alternate reality visited in the main series. In this arc, time-traveler Silver the Hedgehog travels to this time period in an attempt to thwart events that will bring devastation to the future from which he hails. In the process, he ends up joining forces with a new team of Freedom Fighters, made up of children of the heroes from the present reality of the series, to thwart the evil King Shadow the Hedgehog, who unleashes a monstrous fusion of Tikal and Chaos from the video game Sonic Adventure.

Issues #9–12, known as "Knuckles: The Return", in which Knuckles and his teammates, the Chaotix, set out to capture the Echidna villain Dr. Finitevus and punish him for his recent involvement in Knuckles' brief possession by the evil entity Enerjak. As a result of the search, they end up fighting Dr. Finitevus and his temporary allies, a chapter of the Dark Egg Legion composed almost entirely of Platypus members, led by Grandmaster Bill, a former Freedom Fighter. They are joined in battle by the Downunda Freedom Fighters, the local chapter of heroes defending the region. This arc also introduced Thrash the Tasmanian Devil as a temporary Freedom Fighter member, but who acts recklessly and shows particular animosity towards echidnas.

Issues #13–16, called "Journey to the East" (a parody of the Chinese story Journey to the West), this arc took place between issues #209 and #210 of the main series, and featured Sonic, Tails, Sally Acorn, and their ally Monkey Khan traveling to the Dragon Kingdom, Khan's homeland as well as that of their mutual enemies, the Iron Dominion. The purpose of the journey was to break ties between the Iron Queen and King and the four ninja clans who swore allegiance to them. In the process, the group learned more about characters they had previously encountered, formed a temporary alliance with a group of foes known as the Destructix, and were rejoined by estranged ally Espio the Chameleon, who had left the Chaotix to join his people under the Dominion but became free to rejoin the heroes as a result of the efforts of Sonic's group.

Issues #17–20 were a loose adaptation of the SEGA game Tails Adventure, which was also the title of the arc. As in the game, Tails engages the Battle Bird Armada, a group of birds who have set up a facility near the remote Cocoa Island. In the comic's version of events, Antoine and Bunnie D'Coolette, Tails' fellow Freedom Fighters, joined him on this adventure, having traveled with him to Cocoa Island for an overdue honeymoon. In this story it is discovered the Armada are working with Dr. Eggman, but as an independent force not under his control. The arc also establishes connections between the Battle Bird Armada and the Babylon Rogues, who used to work in the faction.

Issues #21–24, named "Treasure Team Tango", starred a variety of SEGA characters. The premise of the arc involved Amy and Cream teaming up with a reluctant Blaze the Cat, dubbed "Team Rose", to locate a nearby Sol Emerald, a magical gemstone that's needed to save Blaze's homeworld. Their search is complicated by the arrival of other parties seeking the gem, including Team Dark, who have been ordered to capture the gem for G.U.N., Team Hooligan, consisting of classic SEGA characters Nack the Weasel, Bark the Polar Bear, and Bean the Dynamite, and Team Babylon, consisting of Jet the Hawk, Wave the Swallow and Storm the Albatross.

Issues #25–28, entitled "The Silver Saga", featured Silver the Hedgehog visiting another alternate future. In this apocalyptic reality, he teamed up with alternate versions of characters from the present-day series under the leadership of Jani-Ca, the daughter of a corrupted Knuckles the Echidna and his love interest in the series, Julie-Su. Together, this group fought against the villainous Enerjak and his minions, who consisted of robotic slaves created from the stolen life force of various characters previously introduced in the series. The first installment marked the series' first landmark issue.

Issues #29–32, called "Scourge: Lock Down", focusing on Sonic's evil counterpart from an alternate dimension, Scourge the Hedgehog. Having previously been handed over to an inter-dimensional police force known as the Zone Cops, Scourge had lost much of his confidence and become the punching bag of many of his fellow inmates. However, things change when the Destructix, former allies of his and led by his girlfriend, Fiona Fox, arrive in the jail with plans to break him out. This arc was notable in that it featured no actual SEGA characters, but rather variations of them exclusive to the comic.

Issues #33–36, known as"Babylon Rising", continued the story of the Babylon Rogues and the Battle Bird Armada. The trio of renegades ended up being forced into rejoining the Armada, and together the two forces set out to locate their lost homeland of Babylon Garden. In this way the arc adapts concepts from the video game Sonic Riders, though again with elements from the ongoing comic series playing a heavy role. This was one of the few arcs to feature Sonic with some prominence, as the Armada eventually attacked the Freedom Fighters' home city in search of their homeland.

Issues #37–40, entitled "Scrambled", focused on the culmination of a rivalry between Dr. Eggman and his nephew Snively. The latter, having departed the Eggman Empire and set out on his own, disrupts Eggman's operations to some degree, forcing him to restore order. After a brief stop in the United Federation, where Snively approaches his half-sister Hope about joining him and Eggman engages military forces under E-123 Omega, Snively heads to the Dragon Kingdom. There Snively rescued his love interest, the imprisoned Iron Queen, before engaging his uncle in a heated showdown.

Issues #41–44, covered "Secret Freedom", starring Silver the Hedgehog and his new teammates, the Secret Freedom Fighters. This group, a black ops style unit created and led by deposed king Elias Acorn, set out to thwart the efforts of the evil wizard king usurper Ixis Naugus, and his traitorous apprentice Geoffrey St. John, who planned to dominate the city of New Mobotropolis though ancient mind controlling magic. In doing so, the group operated in disguise and using codenames so as to prevent their true identities from being discovered by Naugus, who would hurt their vulnerable families and friends if found out.

Issue #45 was the first single-issue story, and served as an adaptation of the racing game Sonic & All-Stars Racing Transformed.  It is not set in the main continuity.

Issues #46–49 starred Team Chaotix in "Chaotix Quest", who traveled to the regions of Mercia and the Great Desert in search of their missing teammates, Ray the Squirrel and Mighty the Armadillo. In the process, they ended up involved in conflicts between the Freedom Fighters and Dark Egg Legion Chapters of both regions. Battling the tyrannical Lord Hood in a raid to free prisoners from his medieval dungeon and fighting against the villainous Jack Rabbit, leader of the rogue Sand Blaster Freedom Fighters and Mighty and Ray and Mighty's long lost sister Matilda are reunited.

Issue #50, Forged In Fire was the second milestone in the series, it would feature a story focusing on Metal Sonic battling Shard the "Mecha" Sonic, this issue including a reprint of Sonic the Hedgehog #25, the story in which both were first introduced (as the same entity). Originally this issue was planned to feature an epilogue to the animated series Sonic Underground.  This was the last issue to be set in the original Pre-Super-Genesis-Wave timeline, which was overwritten by a new reality following the Worlds Collide crossover due to legal issues between Archie and former Sonic writer Ken Penders.

Issue #51–94
Issues #51–54 were included in Archie's "Worlds Collide" story arc, a twelve-issue event featuring a crossover between the Sonic the Hedgehog and Mega Man comic series produced by the company. These issues, rather than being chronologically back to back, were instead released in sequence with the Mega Man and Sonic the Hedgehog issues, serving as parts 2, 5, 8, and 11 of twelve.

Issues #55–58 encompassed the "Pirate Plunder Panic" saga, which directly followed up on the events of the Worlds Collide Crossover, and had connections to the previous Treasure Team Tango arc and the first Sonic Universe arc The Shadow Saga. Amy Rose and Cream the Rabbit, along with recurring anti-villains Bark the Polar Bear and Bean the Dynamite, are transported to the Sol Dimension, the world of Blaze the Cat. The two heroines join up with Blaze and her sidekick, Marine the Raccoon, against a crew of robotic pirates led by the nefarious Captain Metal, in a bid to claim the last of the scattered Sol Emeralds and save Blaze's world from total destruction.

Issues #59–62 covered the "Shadow Fall" saga, which is a sequel of sorts to the video game Shadow the Hedgehog. In this story, a new Black Comet arrives to threaten the earth, carrying the last remaining members of the alien race, the Black Arms, out to avenge their fallen comrades. Team Dark along with a small squad of troops from G.U.N. have been tasked with infiltrating the comet and detonating an atomic bomb on board to destroy it. Shadow is forced to confront his past as an alien soldier when he faces the new Black Arm's leader, Black Death, and the warrior bred specifically to destroy him, Eclipse the Darkling.

Issues #63–66 encompass the "Great Chaos Caper," which runs parallel to the Sonic Unleashed adaptation taking place in the main series. In this, Knuckles and the Chaotix join forces in the hunt for Chaos Emeralds to help the Freedom Fighters in the quest to restore the world to normal after its shattering. In the process, they must contend with the minions of Dark Gaia and the Hooligans, a team of classic Sonic game villains consisting of Nack the Weasel, Bark the Polar Bear, and Bean the Dynamite. Along the way they meet Chip, the Light Gaia.

Issues #67–70 make up the "Total Eclipse" arc, a sequel to both "Shadow Fall" and "Great Chaos Caper", continuing Knuckles and Team Dark's plotlines from both as Eclipse and the Dark Arms land on Angel Island. Team Dark arrives in pursuit of him, and Knuckles reluctantly joins forces with them to hunt down the threat. However, when Eclipse sets out to claim the Master Emerald, Shadow decides to turn it over to G.U.N., enraging Knuckles who fights him to keep the Emerald on Angel Island.  Their infighting results in Eclipse taking the Emerald, forcing Knuckles to shatter it and thus leading to his involvement in the main series' storyline.  Combined, "Shadow Fall", "Great Chaos Caper" and "Total Eclipse" make up the "Dark Trilogy".

Issues #71–74 are the "Spark of Life" arc, which focuses on the artificial intelligence Freedom Fighter known as Nicole. Taking place in a both the "Digital World" and on Isolated Island (from the game Knuckles Chaotix), it introduces the malevolent computer program Phage and Nicole's creator in the new reality, Dr. Ellidy.

Issue #75 is the standalone story "Fury", in which Sonic and Metal Sonic must race to retrieve one of the Chaos Emeralds. The story involves both characters passing through a gateway known as a Genesis Portal and meeting Silver the Hedgehog, who has been traveling across time and space to shut the portals. Metal Sonic ends up stuck in space at the end of the issue.

Issues #76–78 form part of the story of Archie's "Worlds Unite" story arc, a twelve-issue event that marks the second crossover between Sonic and Mega Man, as well as featuring characters from several other Sega and Capcom franchises. Like Worlds Collide, these issues were released in sequence with the Mega Man, Sonic the Hedgehog, and Sonic Boom comics, serving as parts 1, 5, and 9 of twelve.

Issues #79–82 comprise "The Silver Age", which follows Silver as he confronts the threat of the Genesis Portals.  Helping him on his mission are scientist Professor Von Schlemmer (a character from Adventures of Sonic the Hedgehog) and Gold the Tenrec; opposing them is the evil Onyx City Council and their force of Civil Protection Robots.  The events of this arc are set prior to the "Worlds Unite" crossover, despite the issues forming it being released afterward.

Issues #83–86 contain the story arc "Eggman's Dozen", the title of which is a parody of The Dirty Dozen. The title refers to Dr. Eggman's Egg Bosses-his regional enforcers and leaders of the various units of his Egg Army cyborgs-being assembled by Eggman in order to reclaim the Sonic Unleashed location of Eggmanland from the Naugus Twins. These two villains consist of Walter Naugus-the recurring comics villain formerly known as Ixis Naugus (who first appeared in the Sonic the Hedgehog TV series)-and his sister Wendy Naugus-a new character based on the main antagonist from the game Tails' Skypatrol.

Issues #87–90 make up the story "Shattered", in which Knuckles and Amy search for the few remaining shards of the Master Emerald, which had previously been shattered in the final issue of "Total Eclipse". They are joined by Team Dark, who is currently hunting down Eclipse and his Dark Arms; Walter Naugus returns from Eggman's Dozen, plotting to reconstruct the Master Emerald, and disguises himself as an ancient echidna called Nixus to trick Knuckles into giving him the shards.

Issues #91–94 make up the story "The Case of the Pirate Princess". In this one the Chaotix try to save Princess Undina from the Pirates of the Setting Dawn and get caught up in a treasure hunt.
This was the last Sonic Universe story to be released until Archie and Sega ended their partnership and cancelled the comic.

Trade paperbacks

See also
 Sonic the Hedgehog
 Sonic X
 Knuckles the Echidna
 Sonic Boom
 Archie Comics
 Sonic the Comic
 Sonic the Hedgehog (IDW Publishing)
 Ian Flynn
 Tracy Yardley

References

External links
BumbleKing Comics :: View topic - Sonic Universe - Exclusive Early Info

2009 comics debuts
2017 comics endings
Archie Comics titles
Comics based on Sonic the Hedgehog
Comics based on video games
Fantasy comics
Malware in fiction
Comics about parallel universes
Sonic the Hedgehog